Novak Djokovic was the defending champion, but chose not to participate this year.

Mischa Zverev won his first ATP singles title, defeating Lukáš Lacko in the final, 6–4, 6–4.

Seeds
The top four seeds received a bye into the second round.

Draw

Finals

Top half

Bottom half

Qualifying

Seeds

Qualifiers

Lucky loser

Qualifying draw

First qualifier

Second qualifier

Third qualifier

Fourth qualifier

References
 Main Draw
 Qualifying Draw

Eastbourne International - Singles
2018 Men's Singles